Konidela Nagendra "Naga" Babu (born 29 October 1961) is an Indian actor and producer who works in Telugu cinema. As a producer, he won one National Film Award and two Nandi Awards.

Acting career 
Nagendra Babu acts mainly in supporting roles and villain roles, though he has also played the lead role in some films. He has acted in 143, Anji, Shock, Sri Ramadasu, Chandamama and Orange. He has produced several films with his brothers, Chiranjeevi and Pawan Kalyan under Anjana Productions. He has two children, actor Varun Tej and Niharika. He currently appears in television serials and is also a judge on the comedy show, Jabardasth, which aired on ETV.

Political career 
Nagendra Babu joined Jana Sena Party established by his brother Pawan Kalyan and contested as a M.P. candidate for Narasapuram Lok Sabha constituency in the 2019 Indian general election. He lost after securing 2,50,289 votes.

Filmography

As actor
All films are in Telugu unless otherwise stated.

As producer

He debuted as a producer with Rudraveena on the banner Anjana Productions which won the National Award, He has produced eight films.

As dubbing artist 

 Aadukalam Naren (Pizza; Telugu version)

Television

As actor

As judge

References

External links
 
 
 

Telugu film producers
Male actors in Telugu cinema
Indian male film actors
Male actors in Tamil cinema
Television personalities from Andhra Pradesh
Living people
Jana Sena Party politicians
Male actors from Andhra Pradesh
People from West Godavari district
Film producers from Andhra Pradesh
Male actors in Telugu television
Indian male television actors
20th-century Indian male actors
21st-century Indian male actors
1961 births
Producers who won the Best Film on National Integration National Film Award